Edmund Ashworth Radford (February 1881 – 27 May 1944) was a British Conservative politician.

He was the son of George Radford of Manchester and Church Stretton. Following education at Buxton College he became a chartered accountant in 1902.

At the 1924 general election, Radford was elected as Member of Parliament (MP) for Salford South, unseating the sitting Labour MP, Joe Toole. Five years later Toole regained the seat for Labour.

A by-election was held at Manchester Rusholme in November 1933, and Radford held the seat for the Conservatives. He was re-elected at the 1935 general election.

Radford died at his home in Wilmslow, Cheshire in May 1944, aged 63.

References

External links 
 

1881 births
1944 deaths
Conservative Party (UK) MPs for English constituencies
People educated at Buxton College
UK MPs 1924–1929
UK MPs 1931–1935
UK MPs 1935–1945
Members of the Parliament of the United Kingdom for Salford South